Potladurthi is a village in Kadapa district in the Indian state of Andhra Pradesh. Situated in the bank of Penna River on the way of Yeraaguntla and Proddatur road in the area of 4336 acres with the population around 8000 to 9000.

References 

Villages in Kadapa district